Kaly may refer to:
 Kaly (Brno-Country District), a village in the Czech Republic
 Kały-Towarzystwo, a village in central Poland
 Kały, Opole Voivodeship, a village in south-western Poland
 Kaly (film), a 2018 Indian film
 "Kaly", an unreleased song from the Red Hot Chili Peppers' 2016 album The Getaway

KALY may refer to:
 KALY-LP, a low-power radio station (101.7 FM) licensed to serve Minneapolis, Minnesota, United States
 KDSK (AM), a radio station (1240 AM) licensed to serve Los Ranchos de Albuquerque, New Mexico, United States, which held the call sign KALY from 1988 to 2013

See also 

 Kali (disambiguation)
Karly